Eupithecia omniparens is a moth in the family Geometridae first described by Karl Dietze in 1908. It is found in China.

References

Moths described in 1908
omniparens
Moths of Asia